Bharatendu Academy of Dramatic Arts or Bharatendu Natya Akademi is a theatre training institute in Lucknow, India. It is named after Bharatendu Harishchandra, father of Hindi theatre. It offers a two-year full-time diploma course in theatre training. It is an autonomous organisation under the Ministry of Culture, Government of Uttar Pradesh.

History
Bharatendu Natya Academy came into existence as a drama institute on 2 July 1975, by efforts of the theatre personality Raj Bisaria.

In 1975 its name was Bharatendu Natya Kendra and the class was running at the mini Rabindralay (near Lucknow Railway Station). At that time BNA did not have their own building; now it functions from the Bharatendu Bhawan in Gomti Nagar (Vikas Khand-1). Lucknow.

In 1981 the institute started providing a two-year full-time diploma course in theatre training. The institute today selects 20 candidates every year for its two-year intensive post-graduate diploma course with scholarships for the first 12 students. Raj Bisaria was the founder-director. Hindi writer Amritlal Nagar was the first nominated chairperson of the institute. Today Bharatendu Natya Academy has become the second of its kind in India after the National School of Drama, New Delhi. At the end of their course, the second-year students make a visit to the Film and Television Institute of India, Pune or Satyajit Ray Film and Television Institute, Kolkata for the basic training for film and television. This is a kind of extension program is done with the financial support of Film Bandhu (a body under the Cultural Department of the U.P. Government).

Performing spaces
The institute has three auditoriums within the campus:
 B M Shah Auditorium
 Thrust Theatre Auditorium
Apart from that it has a studio theatre and minor performances spaces used on special occasions, During Workshop & Festival.

Notable alumni
 
 
Nalneesh Neel
 Alok Pandey
 Jagat Rawat
 Anupam Shyam
Nawazuddin Siddiqui 
 Rajpal Yadav

See also
Bharatendu Harishchandra
Bhatkhande Sanskriti Vishwavidyalaya
Lucknow College of Arts and Crafts
National School of Drama
National Institute of Dramatic Art
Film and Television Institute of India
State Institute of Film and Television
Satyajit Ray Film and Television Institute
Madhya Pradesh School of Drama

References

External links

 Bhartendu Academy of Dramatic Arts Alumni
Official Website
Department of Culture, U.P.

Film schools in India
Drama schools in India
Bharatendu Academy of Dramatic Arts alumni
Universities and colleges in Lucknow
Educational institutions established in 1975
1975 establishments in Uttar Pradesh